Aloysius Ferdinandus Zichem, C.Ss.R., (Paramaribo February 28, 1933 – Paramaribo November 13, 2016) was a Roman Catholic bishop. He was a member of the Congregation of the Most Holy Redeemer, more commonly known as the Redemptorists.

Ordained to the priesthood in 1960, Zichem served as auxiliary bishop of the Roman Catholic Diocese of Paramaribo, Suriname, from 1969 to 1971. He then served as bishop of the diocese from 1971 to 2003.

Notes

External links

1933 births
2016 deaths
Redemptorist bishops
Surinamese Roman Catholic bishops
Surinamese Roman Catholics
Roman Catholic bishops of Paramaribo